Puff Adder (Gordon Fraley) is a fictional character, a mutant supervillain appearing in American comic books published by Marvel Comics. He made his debut in Captain America #337 (January 1988), created by writer Mark Gruenwald and artist Tom Morgan. The character is depicted primarily as a member of the Serpent Society.

Fraley makes his debut as Puff Adder as part of the fourth version of the Serpent Squad alongside Copperhead, Fer-de-Lance and Black Racer, when the group robs a casino in Las Vegas as a ploy to gain acceptance into the Serpent Society from Society leader Sidewinder. After becoming a part of the Society, they help Viper take control of the Serpent Society, supporting her in a plot to take control of the President of the United States. The plot is eventually foiled by Captain America and several members of the Serpent Society who remain loyal to Sidewinder. After Viper is defeated the Serpent Society was reformed, with Puff Adder becoming a regular member of the group. He later becomes a member of Serpent Solutions when the Serpent Society is reorganized.

Publication history

Puff Adder first appeared in Captain America #337 (January 1988), and was created by Mark Gruenwald and Tom Morgan.

Fictional character biography
Gordon "Gordo" Fraley was born in Atlanta, Georgia. Large and strong but not very bright, Puff Adder is a mutant with the ability to inflate, or "puff," his body mass, enhancing his strength greatly, and making him a dangerous adversary for superheroes.

As a member of the fourth Serpent Squad, Puff Adder attempts to rob a Las Vegas casino, and battles Captain America, the Falcon, Nomad, and D-Man. With the Serpent Squad, he is freed from jail by Sidewinder. Puff Adder is inducted into the second incarnation of the Serpent Society as a double agent of the Viper during her invasion of the group. Puff Adder and the Viper's agents then betray Sidewinder, and encounter Captain America again. With Coachwhip and Rock Python, Puff Adder is sent to steal the Falcon's uniform in order to regain admission into the Serpent Society, and he battles Battle Star and the Falcon. 

Alongside Anaconda, Puff Adder serves as bailiff at the Serpent Society's trial of Diamondback. With Anaconda and Rock Python, Puff Adder is sent to Diamondback's apartment to apprehend her. He battles Captain America and seemingly overpowered him. Puff Adder crash-lands a Serpent Saucer on Diamondback's apartment. He abducts Diamondback, Asp, and Black Mamba. Rock Python and Puff Adder are thrown from the Serpent Saucer by MODAM, and Puff Adder is injured in the fall. He is interrogated by Captain America and Paladin about the abduction of Diamondback and her friends.

As a member of the Serpent Society, he develops a romantic relationship with Anaconda.  He also serves briefly with Doctor Octopus' Masters of Evil. He participates in the attempted takeover of the Avengers Mansion while the other heroes are distracted by the events of the Infinity War. There, the team encounters the Guardians of the Galaxy. Puff Adder is given permission to "play with" Yellowjacket and Nikki but is stopped by Major Victory before he can touch them.

After a brief fight, both teams are overwhelmed with alien doubles of absolutely everyone involved. Out of necessity, the two teams work together to destroy wave after wave of doubles. After the last wave, Doctor Octopus wants his team to continue fighting but Puff Adder, along with the rest, turn on him. They do not want to hurt the others who just helped save their lives. The team chases Doctor Octopus out of the mansion.

He is seen as member of the Serpent Society under Cobra's leadership. After the group captures and chains Captain America and Diamondback (really an L.M.D.) in this underground New York headquarters, the pair escapes. S.H.I.E.L.D. subsequently takes Rattler and the rest of the Society into custody.

He appears in "Brand New Day" as one of the villains in the "Bar With No Name". He is one of many to get in on the super-hero related gambling action headed by the man known only as 'The Bookie'.

He is once again a member of the Serpent Society, who are engaged in a bank robbery. He is instantly defeated by Hope Summers after she copies his powers and knocks him out with a single bolas.

As part of the All-New, All-Different Marvel branding, Puff Adder appears as a member of Viper's Serpent Society under its new name of Serpent Solutions.

Puff Adder appears in the 2017 "Secret Empire" storyline, being with Serpent Solutions when they are recruited by Helmut Zemo to join his Army of Evil.

In a prelude to the "Hunted" storyline, several members of the Serpent Society are captured by Kraven the Hunter, Taskmaster, and Black Ant and forced to participate in a murderous hunt set up by Arcade. Black Mamba, Cottonmouth, Bushmaster, Black Racer, Puff Adder, Rock Python, and Fer-de-Lance are placed in electric cages to wait for the hunt to commence.

During the "Devil's Reign" storyline, Puff Adder and Coachwhip appear as members of Mayor Wilson Fisk's incarnation of the Thunderbolts at the time when Mayor Fisk has outlawed superhero activity. They, alongside the Thunderbolts unit, attack Spider-Woman, only to be fought off by Spider-Woman as she gets Lindsay McRabe to safety.

Powers and abilities
In Guardians of the Galaxy #29 Charlie-27 states that Puff Adder can increase his mass to over five tons, the limit of what Charlie-27 can lift on Earth. Puff Adder can only remain fully inflated for approximately fifteen minutes at a time. Puff Adder also possesses a slight degree of superhuman strength and stamina.

Fraley is a competent hand-to-hand fighter, with extensive experience in street-fighting techniques. He is experienced in the piloting of certain aircraft.

The cowl of Puff Adder's costume contains a pressurized container of noxious gas which can be released from his mouth area. It is activated by a specific motion made with his jaw muscles.

Race variation
His race varies from artist to artist. In his first appearance, he was depicted as Caucasian. A few issues later, he is depicted as African American.

References

External links
 Puff Adder at Marvel.com
 
 

Characters created by Mark Gruenwald
Comics characters introduced in 1988
Fictional African-American people
Fictional characters from Georgia (U.S. state)
Fictional characters who can stretch themselves
Marvel Comics characters with superhuman strength
Marvel Comics martial artists
Marvel Comics mutants
Marvel Comics supervillains